Moqavemat (meaning "resistance", a reference to the Iran–Iraq War) is a city in the Central District of Khorramshahr County, Khuzestan Province, Iran.  Moqavemat is adjacent to the city of Khorramshahr.

References

Populated places in Khorramshahr County

Cities in Khuzestan Province